ʻEhu was an ancient Hawaiian nobleman (Aliʻi) and the Chief of Kona (a place on the island of Hawaiʻi).

Life 
ʻEhu was most likely born on the island of Hawaiʻi. His parents were the High Chief Kuaiwa of Hawaiʻi and one of his wives, Kamanawa-a-Kalamea. ʻEhu became the ruler of Kona, one part of Hawaiʻi. He married Kapohauola, and their son was ʻEhunuikaimalino. Another wife of ʻEhu was a woman called Kahoʻea (Ka-hoʻea), and they had a son named Kama-ʻiole.

After the death of ʻEhu, his son ʻEhunuikaimalino became the Chief of Kona.

See also 

Kuaiwa
Alii nui of Hawaii

References

External links 
Ehu ('Ehu) (Alii-o-Kona)

House of Pili